Vechernyaya Odessa (literally Evening Odesa) is Odesa, Ukraine's most widely read newspaper, published from 1 July 1973 three times per week.

Murder of Boris Derevyanko 
On August 11, 1997, Boris Derevyanko, who had been the editor of Vechernyaya Odessa for 24 years, was shot and killed on a city street in broad daylight on his way to work. He was 59 years old. International news organizations and the regional prosecutor concluded that Derevyanko was assassinated because of his editorial work, as a known critic of local post-communist politicians. A suspect was arrested in September and confessed to performing the contract killing.

See also
List of newspapers in Ukraine

References 
 "Journalists Killed in 1997: Ukraine" Committee to Protect Journalists. Retrieved June 15, 2007.
 "Veteran journalist killed", International Press Institute, 12 August 1997. Retrieved June 15, 2007.
 "Boris Derevyanko", Newseum, The Freedom Forum Journalists Memorial. Retrieved June 15, 2007.
 Ассоциация "Вечерняя Одесса" at OdessaGlobe.com. Retrieved June 15, 2007.

External links
 

Publications established in 1973
Russian-language newspapers published in Ukraine
Mass media in Odesa